Chaleh Tarkhan Rural District is in Qaleh Now District of Ray County, Tehran province, Iran. On 16 September 2012, nine villages separated from Qaleh Now Rural District in Kahrizak District to form Chaleh Tarkhan. At the most recent census of 2016, the population of the rural district was 14,299 in 4,188 households. The largest of its nine villages was Firuzabad, with 8,756 people.

References 

Ray County, Iran

Rural Districts of Tehran Province

Populated places in Tehran Province

Populated places in Ray County, Iran